Penicillium tricolor is a species of fungus in the genus Penicillium which was isolated from wheat in Canada. Penicillium tricolor produces xanthomegnin, viomellein, vioxanthin, terrestric acid, rugulosuvine, verrucofortine, puberuline, asteltoxin

References

Further reading 
 
 

tricolor
Fungi described in 1994